Unrein (German for "Impure") is the fifth studio album by German rock band Oomph!. It is the first album released on Virgin Schallplatten.

Track listing
 Mutters Schoß (Mother's Lap) (01:12)
 Unsere Rettung (Our Salvation) (05:04)
 Die Maske (The Mask) (06:06)
 My Hell (05:19)
 Gekreuzigt (Crucified) (04:22)
 Zero Endorphine (03:06) (instrumental)
 Willst du mein Leben entern? (Do You Want to Board My Life?) (04:20)
 (Why I'll Never Be) Clean Again (05:28)
 Unrein (Impure) (05:51)
 Anniversary (04:51)
 Foil (04:31)
 Bastard (06:51)
 Another Disease (05:30)
 Meine Wunden (My Wounds) (07:15)
 This Time (4:36)*
 Monolith (4:20) (instrumental)*

* "This Time" and "Monolith" were  later added as bonus tracks for the Napalm Records re-release of the album in September 2019.

Credits

 Produced by Oomph!
 Music composed by Oomph!
 Lyrics written by Dero Goi

External links
 Oomph! - Unrein at Discogs

Oomph! albums
1998 albums
Virgin Records albums
German-language albums